Sarah Louise Fogwill (born September 1988) was a Hampshire Women's cricketer . Fogwill was right-handed batsman who bowls right arm medium.

Fogwill made her debut for Sussex in the Sussex U13's in 2002. She successfully played for all junior ages groups and made her debut for the Senior XI under the captaincy of Alexia Walker in 2007.

In 2009 Fogwill moved cross borders to play for the Hampshire Women's Senior XI. Making her debut against Scotland in 2009, Fogwill went on to be an important all rounder, captaining on numerous occasions in the 2009 and 2010 seasons.

In 2011 Fogwill played for England in the Indoor cricket World Cup, South Africa. Following this she wrote a book for Teachers and Coaches, helping them to improve the younger generation of Cricketers. In 2017 Fogwill played for England in the Indoor cricket World Cup, Dubai.

Club career

Sarah currently plays and captains Brighton and Hove and plays for Derby indoor cricket team.

Sarah had her book "KS1 and KS2 Cricket" published and is currently selling Worldwide.

Overseas
Fogwill played a season for Old Boys Collegians Cricket Club Women's First XI in Christchurch, New Zealand in 2007-2008 as a batting alrounder.

References

Living people
1988 births
Place of birth missing (living people)
Hampshire women cricketers
Sussex women cricketers
Leicestershire women cricketers